The Choctaw are a Native American people.

Choctaw may also refer to:
 Choctaw language
 Choctaw Nation of Oklahoma

Places
 Choctaw County, Alabama
 Choctaw National Wildlife Refuge, a wildlife refuge in Alabama
 Choctaw (Natchez, Mississippi), a historic house in Natchez On-Top-of-the-Hill Historic District
 Choctaw, Bolivar County, Mississippi
 Choctaw, Neshoba County, Mississippi
 Choctaw County, Mississippi
 Choctaw, Oklahoma, a suburb of Oklahoma City
 Choctaw County, Oklahoma

Vehicles
 H-34 Choctaw, a helicopter
 SS Choctaw, a semi-whaleback ship that sank in 1915
 USS Choctaw (1856), an ironclad ram of the American Civil War
 USS Choctaw (1898), a tugboat in service from 1898 to 1940, renamed USS Wicomico in 1918
 USS Choctaw (AT-70), a tug in service from 1943 to 1947

Other uses
 Choctaw Agency, Indian Territory
 Choctaw County School District, Mississippi
 Choctaw turn, a figure skating element
 Choctaw Club, headquarters of the Regular Democratic Organization

See also
 Choctaw Corner
 Choctaw Corner, Alabama
 Choctaw Lake, Ohio, an unincorporated town in Ohio
 Choctaw, Oklahoma and Gulf Railroad, a predecessor line of the Rock Island
 Choctaw Rocket, a passenger train
 Jena Band of Choctaw Indians
 Mississippi Band of Choctaw Indians
 USS Choctaw, a list of ships